Ehtesham Javed Akber Khan is a Pakistani politician, who had been a member of the Khyber Pakhtunkhwa Assembly from September 2014 to May 2018 and from August 2018 to January 2023, belonging to the Pakistan Tehreek-e-Insaf.

Political career
Khan was elected as the member of the Khyber Pakhtunkhwa Assembly as a candidate of Pakistan Tehreek-e-Insaf (PTI) from PK-68 (D.I. Khan-V) in a by-election held in September 2014 due to the disqualification of Javed Akbar Khan, his father, over a fake degree case.

He was re-elected as a member of the Provincial Assembly of Khyber Pakhtunkhwa from PK-95 (Dera Ismail Khan-I) as an independent candidate in the 2018 elections.

He rejoined PTI on 29 October 2022.

References

Living people
Pashtun people
Khyber Pakhtunkhwa MPAs 2013–2018
People from Dera Ismail Khan District
Pakistan Tehreek-e-Insaf politicians
Year of birth missing (living people)